BPP Holdings Limited is a holding company of the United Kingdom-based provider of professional and academic education. It was a subsidiary of the American for-profit higher education company Apollo Global since July 2009, having formerly been listed on the London Stock Exchange and a constituent of the FTSE 250 Index, before being purchased by TDR Capital in March 2021.

History
The company was founded by Alan Brierley, Richard Price and Charles Prior in 1976 as Brierley Price Prior to provide training to accountancy students. It was first listed on the London Stock Exchange in 1987. Also in 1987 the company acquired Mander Portman Woodward, a provider of Fifth and Sixth Form teaching. Then in 1992 the company established BPP Law School which in 2005 became a founding School of BPP College of Professional Studies, which provides legal as well as business management training. In 2007 the Privy Council awarded BPP College powers to award degrees. The company was acquired by Apollo Global for £368 million in July 2009. In July 2010 BPP College was awarded University college status. In August 2013, BPP University College was granted full university status and now is known as BPP University.

In December 2020, several media outlets, including The Lawyer and Legal Cheek, reported that BPP's Public Relations team had been warned by Wikipedia for “disruptive editing” practices on the page for the BPP Holdings-owned BPP University, and ended up being “banned indefinitely” from editing the online encyclopaedia. Whilst stating that the edits were “minor”, a BPP spokesperson said the company will henceforth “follow Wikipedia’s guidance” for editing. A spokesperson for BPP's PR agency Gerard Kelly & Partners (GKP), which was on the receiving end of the ban, issued a statement stating that the BPP PR team will henceforth follow guidelines on editing “as advised by Wikipedia.”

The company was acquired by TDR Capital in March 2021. 

In November 2021 BPP acquired Estio Training.

References

External links
BPP Holdings official site

Companies formerly listed on the London Stock Exchange
Holding companies established in 1976
Education companies of the United Kingdom
Apollo Education Group
1976 establishments in England
British companies established in 1976
2021 mergers and acquisitions